William Stephens (January 17, 1752 – August 6, 1819) was a United States district judge of the United States District Court for the District of Georgia.

Education and career

Born on January 17, 1752, in Bewlie (now Beaulieu), Province of Georgia, British America, Stephens served in the Continental Army as a second lieutenant during the American Revolutionary War. He was later a colonel in the Chatham County, Georgia militia. He was a clerk for the Georgia Commons House of Assembly starting in 1775. He was Attorney General of the Province of Georgia until 1776. He was chief justice of the Supreme Court of Georgia starting in 1780. He was President of Savannah, Georgia starting in 1787. He was Mayor of Savannah from 1793 to 1795. He was a judge of the Superior Court of Georgia.

Federal judicial service

Stephens received a recess appointment from President Thomas Jefferson on October 22, 1801, to a seat on the United States District Court for the District of Georgia vacated by Judge Joseph Clay Jr. He was nominated to the same position by President Jefferson on January 6, 1802. He was confirmed by the United States Senate on January 26, 1802, and received his commission the same day. His service terminated on October 13, 1818, due to his resignation.

Death

Stephens died on August 6, 1819, in Savannah.

References

Sources

External links
 William Stephens F&AM historical marker

1752 births
1819 deaths
Chief Justices of the Supreme Court of Georgia (U.S. state)
Georgia (U.S. state) state court judges
Mayors of Savannah, Georgia
Judges of the United States District Court for the District of Georgia
United States federal judges appointed by Thomas Jefferson
19th-century American judges
Continental Army officers from Georgia (U.S. state)